Moorlands may refer to:

 Moorlands, Auchenflower, a heritage-listed building in Brisbane, Queensland, Australia
 Moorlands, South Australia, a locality east of Tailem Bend, Australia
 Moorland, a type of habitat found in upland areas

See also
Moorland (disambiguation)